Frederick E. Berry (December 20, 1949 – November 13, 2018) was a disability rights advocate and Democratic politician from Massachusetts, who served as a member of the Massachusetts Senate from 1983 to 2013. He served as majority leader of the state Senate from 2003 until his retirement in 2013.

Biography 
Frederick E. Berry was born in Peabody, Massachusetts on December 20, 1949. He was a graduate of Bishop Fenwick High School, Boston College (in 1972) and Antioch College, M. Ed. (1974).

After graduating from college, Berry joined VISTA. He was assigned to Corpus Christi, Texas, where he worked with several nonprofits over a 15-month period.

Born with cerebral palsy, Berry returned to Massachusetts and became the director of Heritage Industries, a division of Northeast Arc, which provided employment and job training for those with disabilities.

Before his election to the Senate, Berry was a Peabody City Council member (1979–1983)

Berry, representing Essex County in the State Senate from 1983, was previously Second Assistant Majority Floor Leader (1991–1994) and Assistant Majority Floor Leader (1995–1996), before becoming Majority Leader himself in 2003.

Berry retired from the Senate in 2013. In his retirement, Berry returned to work part-time at Northeast Arc as an ambassador to area businesses.

Berry died on November 13, 2018 at the age of 68.

See also
 1987–1988 Massachusetts legislature
 1993–1994 Massachusetts legislature

References

Senator Frederick E. Berry – Legislature website
Wicked Local - Topsfield

1949 births
2018 deaths
People from Peabody, Massachusetts
Antioch College alumni
Boston College alumni
Democratic Party Massachusetts state senators
Massachusetts city council members
Bishop Fenwick High School (Peabody, Massachusetts) alumni